The 2015–16 season was PAOK's 90th in existence and the club's 57th consecutive season in the top flight of Greek football. The team will enter the Greek Cup in the Second Round and will also compete in UEFA Europa League starting from the Group stage.

On 18 June 2015, Igor Tudor become PAOK's manager after signing a three-year contract. In 2016, he was sacked after poor results. Vladimir Ivić was appointed his successor.

Club

Coaching staff

Board of Directors

Players

Squad

Out on loan

Transfers

In

Out

Kit

2015

|
|

2015–16

|
|
|
|

Friendlies
All times at  EET

Competitions

Overview

Managerial statistics

1The match against olympiacos in the semifinal cup are not included

Super League Greece

League table

Results summary

Results by round

Matches

Play-offs

Table

Matches

Greek Football Cup

Group stage

Round of 16

Quarter-finals

Semi-finals

1 Match abandoned in the 90th minute with the score at 1–2. It was later rewarded as a 0–3 win for Olympiacos.
2 PAOK didn't show up to the match, so Olympiacos was awarded a 3–0 walkover

UEFA Europa League

Second qualifying round

All times at CET

Third qualifying round

Play-off round

Group stage

Statistics

Squad statistics

Note:    1 Players left the club in summer TW   2 Players left the club in winter TW

Goalscorers

1Players left the club in transfer windows.

Disciplinary record

References

External links
 PAOK FC official website

PAOK FC seasons
PAOK FC season